Tiberiy Popovich (originally , ; 20 September 1930 – 10 February 2008) was an association footballer from the former Soviet Union who played for FC Dynamo Kyiv.

In 1956 Popovich played couple of games for Ukraine at the Spartakiad of the Peoples of the USSR.

References

1930 births
2008 deaths
People from Mukachevo
Hungarian people of Ukrainian descent
Hungarian people of Polish descent
Soviet footballers
Ukrainian footballers
Soviet Top League players
FC Karpaty Mukacheve players
FC Dynamo Kyiv players
NK Veres Rivne players
Soviet football managers
NK Veres Rivne managers
FC Avanhard Ternopil managers
FC Mariupol managers
FC Dnipro Cherkasy managers
Merited Coaches of Ukraine
Association football defenders
Ukrainian football managers
Sportspeople from Zakarpattia Oblast